Akeem Wayne Byron Scott ([born September 2, 1983) is an American basketball player who plays for RANS PIK Basketball in the Indonesian Basketball League and the Jamaica national basketball team.

Early life
A native of Harlem, Scott starred at Gar-Field Senior High School in Woodbridge, Virginia. He attended Garrett College for two years, earning All-American honors, before transferring to High Point ahead of his junior season.

Professional career
Scott began his professional career with Finnish club Korihait in 2006 and averaged 17.3 points, 1.7 assists and 2.1 steals per game. He signed with second-tier club PuHu Juniorit the following season, recording 29.2 points and 2.9 assists per game across 23 games before he was moved up to first-tier club Espoon Honka in February 2008. He played in the final seven regular season games before leading his team to a Korisliiga league title, scoring 36 points and the game-winning basket to earn Finals MVP honors. He played with Espoon Honka again during the 2008–09 season, then appeared in two EuroCup games with Latvian team BK Ventspils in late 2009. Scott returned to Finland soon after, playing with Lappeenrannan NMKY in 2009–10. He subsequently played in Montenegro, Mexico and Venezuela.

Scott attended a two-day open tryout in Atlanta for the Bakersfield Jam in October 2014 and was invited to their training camp the following month. He made the final roster and averaged 10.4 points, three assists and 1.8 rebounds per game in five games.

Scott signed with the Brampton A's of Canada in November 2014.

He spent the 2015–16 season with AB Ancud in Chile, averaging 28.3 points, 6.3 rebounds and 4.3 assists across 30 games. He then signed with Uruguayan club Biguá in February 2016.

He played with Chilean team Universidad de Concepción in 2016–17, earning first-team all-league and defensive player of the year honors.

He joined the Saigon Heat in October 2017.

In August 2018, he signed with the Laguneros de La Comarca ahead of the 2018–19 LNBP season. He then played for the Venados de Mazatlán during the 2019 CIBACOPA season. He recorded 35 points, five assists and five rebounds in his team debut, a 93–90 victory against the Tijuana Zonkeys on April 12.

Scott signed with the Danang Dragons in Vietnam in June 2021.

Scott signed with the RANS PIK Basketball in Indonesia in March 2022

References

External links
Akeem Scott at RealGM
https://www.sports-reference.com/cbb/players/akeem-scott-1.html

https://www.basketball-reference.com/gleague/players/s/scottak01d.html
https://basketball.asia-basket.com/player/Akeem-Scott/Vietnam/Danang-Dragons/52625

1983 births
Living people
American expatriate basketball people in Canada
American men's basketball players
American people of Jamaican descent
Bakersfield Jam players
Basketball players from New York City
BK Ventspils players
Espoon Honka players
Jamaican expatriate basketball people in Finland
American expatriate basketball people in Chile
American expatriate basketball people in Finland
American expatriate basketball people in Latvia
American expatriate basketball people in Mexico
American expatriate basketball people in Montenegro
American expatriate basketball people in Uruguay
American expatriate basketball people in Venezuela
American expatriate basketball people in Vietnam
Garrett Lakers men's basketball players
High Point Panthers men's basketball players
Jamaican expatriate basketball people in Uruguay
Jamaican men's basketball players
KK Mornar Bar players
Laguneros de La Comarca players
London Lightning players
Jamaican expatriate basketball people in Canada
Jamaican expatriate basketball people in Latvia
Jamaican expatriate basketball people in Mexico
Jamaican expatriate basketball people in Montenegro
Jamaican expatriate basketball people in Vietnam
People from Harlem
Pioneros de Quintana Roo players
Point guards
Saigon Heat players
Sportspeople from Manhattan
Venados de Mazatlán (basketball) players
Jamaican expatriate basketball people in Venezuela